Mark Howe is an ice hockey player.

Mark Howe may also refer to:
 Mark Antony De Wolfe Howe (bishop) (1808–1895), first Bishop of the Episcopal Diocese of Central Pennsylvania
 Mark Antony De Wolfe Howe (writer) (1864–1960), his son, American editor and author
 Mark Antony De Wolfe Howe (historian), his son, Harvard law professor, historian, biographer and civil rights leader